The FOW Heavyweight Championship is a professional wrestling title in American independent promotion Future of Wrestling. The title was created when "Ram Man" Johnny Evans won the title in Miami, Florida on May 1, 1998. It was defended throughout southern Florida, most often in Davie, Oakland Park, Pembroke Pines and occasionally in Ft. Lauderdale and Tampa, Florida. The title was also defended outside the United States during international tours to Peru and Saudi Arabia in 1999 and 2002 respectively. There have been a total of 21 recognized individual champions, who have had a combined 30 official reigns.

Title history

Combined reigns

References

External links
 FOW Heavyweight Championship

Heavyweight wrestling championships